The NRING Circuit (also: Нижегородское кольцо) is a race track located near Nizhny Novgorod in Russia. The track opened in 2010 as a professional racing venue. Furthermore the facility contains an oval, a drag strip, a kart track and a training circuit. From 2010, the Russian Touring Car Championship stages rounds on this track.

Lap records
The official race lap records at the NRING Circuit are listed as:

References

External links 
 Circuit website

Motorsport venues in Russia
Sport in Nizhny Novgorod
Buildings and structures in Nizhny Novgorod